At the 1904 Summer Olympics in St. Louis, six archery events were contested, of which three were men's and three were women's competitions. 23 men and 6 women constituted the field. As was common in early Olympic archery, the events held in 1904 had little resemblance to the previous edition's events. The events were essentially United States national championships: formally named the 26th Grand Annual Target Meeting of the National Archery Association and, while open to international entrants, having no foreign competitors (with some archers from the Philippines entering but not competing). Team archery was introduced at these Games, as was women's archery. The medalists were the same for both men's individual events (George Bryant taking gold, Robert Williams silver, and William Thompson bronze in both) and both women's individual events (Matilda Howell gold, Emma Cooke silver, Eliza Pollock bronze). Howell finished with three golds as she was a member of the only women's team to appear.

In addition to the six events recognized as Olympic events by the International Olympic Committee, there were also medals awarded for the top scores at each range in the Olympic events, separate flight shooting (longest distance) events, and an "Anthropology Days" event.

Medal summary

Schedule

Participating nations

Medal table

References

External links
 International Olympic Committee medal database

 
1904 Summer Olympics events
1904
1904 in archery